Stephen Sherwood (born 10 December 1953 in Selby, England) is an English former footballer who played as a goalkeeper, best remembered for his time at Watford, Chelsea and Grimsby Town.

Career
He played for Watford for 11 years, making 211 league appearances during  Watford's most successful years under Graham Taylor and was in goal for the team when they lost 2–0 to Everton in the 1984 FA Cup final. He is one of the few goalkeepers to score a goal, against Coventry in 1984. His opposite number that day was Raddy Avramovic.

He started his career at Chelsea, breaking into the first team and making just 16 appearances between 1971 and 1976. At the end of the second of two loan spells with Brentford, he became the first ever loan player to go through a season as an ever-present in league matches, playing 46 matches in 1974–75, a season in which he was also voted the club's Supporters' Player of the Year. After Watford he played for Grimsby Town and Northampton Town and made an exit from league football in 1994 at the age of 40, moving on to Gateshead before retiring in 1998 with Gainsborough Trinity.

Personal life
His older brother is John Sherwood, a bronze medallist for hurdles at the 1968 Mexico City Olympics. He is now a financial adviser in Grimsby.

Honours 
 Brentford Supporters' Player of the Year: 1974–75

References

External links
Blind, Stupid and Desperate - Watford FC site - Tributes - Steve Sherwood

1953 births
Living people
English footballers
Association football goalkeepers
English Football League players
Chelsea F.C. players
Northampton Town F.C. players
Watford F.C. players
Grimsby Town F.C. players
Gateshead F.C. players
Gainsborough Trinity F.C. players
Millwall F.C. players
Brentford F.C. players
Connecticut Bicentennials players
North American Soccer League (1968–1984) players
Lincoln City F.C. players
English expatriate footballers
English expatriate sportspeople in the United States
Expatriate soccer players in the United States
National League (English football) players
Northern Premier League players
People from Selby
FA Cup Final players